Blanche Lamontagne-Beauregard (January 13, 1889 – May 25, 1958) was a Canadian poet.

She was born in Les Escoumins, Québec, and attended various convent schools before taking classes around 1910 at the École d'enseignement secondaire pour les jeunes filles (which became the Collège Marguerite-Bourgeoys in 1926 and borrowed much of its curriculum from Université Laval). She may have studied literature at the University of Montreal. Her first poetry collection, Visions gaspésiennes (1913), received the Prix de la Société du parler français au Canada. After her marriage to lawyer Hector Beauregard in July 1920, she was able to devote herself to writing. She belongs to Québec's regionalist school of writing and drew largely upon the folklore of the Gaspé Peninsula.

Bibliography 

1913 - Visions gaspésiennes (French, Gaspesian visions)
1917 - Par nos champs et nos rives... (By our fields and shores...)
1920 - La Vieille Maison (The old house)
1923 - Les Trois Lyres (The three quadrants)
1924 - Un Cœur fidèle (A faithful heart)
1924 - Récits et Légendes (Accounts and legends)
1926 - La Moisson nouvelle (The new harvest)
1927 - Légendes gaspésiennes : récits en prose avec illustrations de l'auteur (Gaspesian legends, accounts in prose with illustrations of the author)
1928 - Ma Gaspésie (My Gaspesia)
1931 - Au Fond des bois (Deep within the woods1935 - Dans la Brousse : poèmes (In the bush: poems)
1943 - Le Rêve d'André (André's dream)

Collections published after her death

1989 - Anthologie de Blanche Lamontagne-Beauregard : première poétesse du Québec (Anthology of Blanche Lamontagne-Beauregard: first female poet of Québec)
1991 - Les Quatre Saisons : poèmes choisis (The four seasons: selected poems'')

References 

1889 births
1958 deaths
20th-century Canadian poets
Université de Montréal alumni
Canadian women poets
People from Côte-Nord
Writers from Quebec
Canadian poets in French
20th-century Canadian women writers